Thalatta is a genus of moths of the family Erebidae described by Francis Walker in 1858. The species of this genus are from India, South-east Asia and Sundaland.

Species
Some species of this genus are:
 Thalatta argentimacula Candeze 1927
 Thalatta fasciosa Moore 1882 (India)
 Thalatta melanogramma Hampson 1926
 Thalatta prapata ( Kobes) (Peninsular Malaysia)
 Thalatta precedens Walker, 1858 (India)
 Thalatta holortha Hampson (Sundaland)
 Thalatta argentipuncta (Kobes)

According to an article, this, along with many others of the family Noctuidae are highly toxic to canines.

References

Calpinae